Abbassus or Ambasum (Latin: Abbassus), was an ancient town of Phrygia, on the frontiers of the Tolistoboii, in Galatia. It is, perhaps, the same as the Alamassus reported by of Hierocles, and the Amadasse whose bishops attended early church councils. The editors of the Barrington Atlas of the Greek and Roman World note that its probable location is near Synnada, however its precise location is not known.

References

Populated places in Phrygia
Former populated places in Turkey
Roman towns and cities in Turkey
Populated places of the Byzantine Empire
Lost ancient cities and towns